Moresby Camp is a settlement on Moresby Island in the Haida Gwaii archipelago in British Columbia.

Climate

References

Settlements in British Columbia
Populated places in Haida Gwaii